The Nokia 6600 is a smartphone introduced on 16 June 2003 by Nokia, costing approximately €600 when released in October 2003. It was Nokia's high-end model of the 6xxx Classic Business Series. At the time of release, it was the most advanced product ever launched by Nokia, and it runs on Symbian OS 7.0s (Series 60 2nd Edition). It also featured a VGA camera, a music player and video player, Bluetooth and extended storage by memory card, being the second non-Communicator to do so (after the Nokia 3650).

The model is still in use in many parts of the world and has proved to be a durable product. By many users it is considered as the trend setter phone which proved to be a bright milestone for its manufacturer. The phone was intended to replace the popular 6310i as the predominant business class model in the Nokia range. It should not be confused with the newer Nokia 6600 fold, Nokia 6600 slide and Nokia 6600i phones which have little resemblance to the original 6600. A variant of the Nokia 6600 was launched in the U.S. market as the Nokia 6620.

During its lifespan, the 6600 sold 150 million units, making it one of the most successful phones to date.

Features 

 Integrated (VGA 640x480) camera
 Video recorder with audio support (records up to 95 KB - from 9 to 27 seconds - with built-in recorder application) also
 Streaming video and audio
 Wireless connectivity with Bluetooth and IrDA
 6 MB internal memory
 MMC card slot for additional user memory and applications
 Java MIDP 2.0 and Symbian(series 60) applications
 Data synchronization with PC via PC Suite and iSync
 Tri-band operation in GSM E900/1800/1900 networks

Additional features:
 ARM compatible (ARM4T architecture)
 Symbian Operating System 7.0s
 CPU running at 104 MHz
 176x208 (65,536 colours) TFT display
 5-way joystick navigation
 HSCSD and GPRS, for internet/WAP access

Although the initial batches of the Nokia 6600 were not stable, later system software upgrades corrected the situation.

The phone has the capacity to support the installation of a wide range of third-party software such as mp3 and multimedia players, games, web browsers, office suites, and GUI themes, via Java and ePoc (*.sis) installers.  GUI themes can be created using the free Nokia Symbian Theme Studio.

The model was released to the general public in two color schemes: black and white and full black. Additional color schemes (blue and white, pink) were produced for promotional purposes.

In the year 2007, Nokia stopped production of the 6600 handsets.

Related handsets 
 Nokia 6620

See also 
Cellular (2004 film) - The phone that Chris Evans uses during most of the movie is a Nokia 6600.

References

External links 

 Forum Nokia 6600 device spec webpage
 Nokia 6600 pictures of standard colour model

Nokia smartphones
Symbian devices
Mobile phones introduced in 2003
Mobile phones with infrared transmitter
Mobile phones with user-replaceable battery